Acorn Bank Garden & Watermill is a National Trust property situated just north of Temple Sowerby, near Penrith, Cumbria, England.

The property is noted for its garden, which features herbs — over 250 medicinal and culinary herbs — and orchards with old varieties of English fruit as well as a partially restored watermill.

The garden is surrounded, and protected, by ancient oaks and high walls.

It was left to the trust in 1950 by Dorothy Una Ratcliffe, a popular author in the Yorkshire dialect, who bought and restored the house and garden.

External links
Acorn Bank Garden & Watermill information at the National Trust

Gardens in Cumbria
Grade II listed buildings in Cumbria
National Trust properties in Cumbria
Tourist attractions in Cumbria
Watermills in Cumbria